Chief Michael Olasubomi "Subomi" Balogun (born 9 March 1934) is a Nigerian Yoruba banker and philanthropist who founded First City Merchant Bank, a company that later became the FCMB group.

Balogun was a long time member of the council of the Nigerian Stock Exchange.

Life
He was born in 1934 at Ijebu-Ode, Ogun State, Nigeria to Muslim parents. Balogun converted to Christianity while in secondary school. He graduated from Igbobi College and studied Law at the London School of Economics. Before leaving for Europe, he briefly worked as a teacher. As a student in London, Balogun regularly attended fellowships and had the opportunity to meet some noted Nigerians such as Yakubu Gowon before the latter was president. After earning his law degree, he returned to Nigeria to join the Ministry of Justice, Western Region. From the regional Ministry of Justice where he was a Crown Counsel, Balogun found a new post as a Parliamentary Counsel in the Federal Ministry of Justice.

After the January 1966 coup, he joined the Nigerian Industrial Development Bank. At NIDB, his interest in investment banking led him to advocate for the establishment of merchant bank sponsored by NIDB. When ICON securities, a merchant banking outfit was established in 1973 as a subsidiary of NIDB, Balogun  moved to ICON Ltd as a director of operations. When Balogun's ambition to head ICON was not realised, he left he firm to found City Securities, a stock broking and issuing house. City Securities developed relationships with Mobil, Texaco and Total petroleum marketing companies, handling the companies equity offerings. In 1979, he applied for a merchant banking license to establish First City Merchant Bank. Balogun was inspired by the entrepreneurial works of Siegmund Warburg, who co-founded S.G. Warburg, he visited Warburg in London prior to establishing his merchant bank. He often tells the anecdotal story of how his son inspired him to take the leap in starting the bank. When the operations of the bank took effect in 1983, Balogun established an entrepreneurial culture at the new bank, unique as an owner managed bank in contrast to the government owned banks at the time.

Balogun built a National Pediatric Centre in Ijebu-Ode that he donated to University of Ibadan's, University College Teaching Hospital.

Chieftaincy titles
A direct descendant of Oba Tunwase of Ijebu-Ode, Chief Balogun currently holds the chieftaincy title Otunba Tunwase of Ijebuland. He is also the Olori Omoba of Ijebuland and the Asiwaju of Ijebu Christians.

References

1934 births
Living people
Nigerian bankers
Yoruba bankers
Nigerian former Muslims
Converts to Christianity from Islam
Igbobi College alumni
Alumni of the London School of Economics
Yoruba princes
Nigerian Christians
People from Ijebu Ode
Nigerian stockbrokers
Nigerian princes
Nigerian company founders